"Bajo Otra Luz" (English: "Under Another Light") is a song recorded by Canadian singer-songwriter Nelly Furtado featuring guest vocals from Mexican-American singer-songwriter Julieta Venegas and Spanish singer-rapper La Mala Rodríguez. It was released on May 4, 2010, as the third and final single and also during a special iTunes promotion counting down to the release of her fourth studio album, Mi Plan. The song was written entirely by Venegas and also the song was later released for radio airplay the same day of release.

Commercial release
"Bajo Otra Luz" was released as promotional download single on August 31, 2009, as part of the countdown to the release of Mi Plan. It was the third track to be lifted for a promotional release. The version released to iTunes does not include Julieta Venegas' vocals, as she was unable to record vocals for the single edit due to pregnancy. Instead, Spanish singer Celia Palli recorded vocals for the single edit.

Music video
According to Furtado's Twitter account, the music video for "Bajo Otra Luz" was recorded between May 15 and 16, 2010. Julieta Venegas does not appear in the video because of her pregnancy. The video was released July 1, 2010 and features Furtado and La Mala Rodríguez through the streets of Little Italy, Toronto wearing different costumes and suits. Furtado expresses the theme of the video to being humorous and fun. Wearing popular costumes such as a cavewoman, she-devil, Bjork's swan dress, Native American, Britney Spears and even paying homage to the Wizard of Oz's Dorothy character. On Furtado's Vevo page, as of October 2015, "Bajo Otra Luz" has received over 9,300,000 views.

Lyrical content
The lyrics talk about a new relationship, which the protagonist is very proud of because she feels that her life has completely changed. Verses like "El color de mi vida cambió desde que tú llegaste" ("The colour of my life changed since you came") showcase the song's meaning. The song was completely written by Julieta Venegas, and includes a rap verse in the bridge which was written and performed by La Mala Rodríguez. Amongst all of Furtado's releases, this is one of the few in which she does not have credit for writing.

Track listing
 "Bajo Otra Luz" (Album Version) – 4:19
 "Bajo Otra Luz" (Single Edit) – 3:35

Credits and personnel
Produced and arranged by Demacio Castellón, Nelly Furtado and Julieta Venegas
Co-produced by Michael Anthony
Engineered by Demacio Castellón and Julian Vazquez
Assistant engineered by Jason "Metal" Donkersgoed
Mixed by Demacio Castellón and Nelly Furtado
Digital editing by Ron Taylor
Guitars by Dan Turco
Trumpets by Brownman Ali
Recorded at The Hit Factory Criteria, Miami, Florida

Source:

Release history

References

2010 singles
Nelly Furtado songs
Julieta Venegas songs
Spanish-language songs
Music videos directed by Aaron A
Songs written by Julieta Venegas
2009 songs
Universal Music Latino singles